André Birabeau (6 December 1890 – 1 October 1974) was a French novelist, playwright and screenwriter.

Novels and short stories
 La débauche (1924), English trans. Revelation (1930). Cited as the first novel about a homosexual man from the mother's point of view
 Voyage d'agrément, became 1935 movie
 Chfr. 35 (short story, 1928), became 1942 French movie À vos ordres, Madame
 Le jardin aux vingt-cinq allées (1928)
 Désirable (1949)
 La belle égarée (1965)
 Rendez-vous avec l'amour (1972)
 L'amour naît où il veut (1974)

Plays 

 Le coeur sur la main (1919)
 La peau (with Nicolas Nancey, 1919)
 Le bébé barbu (1920)
 La Femme fatale (1920), became 1946 movie
 Une sacrée petite blonde (with Pierre Woolf, 1921)
 Est-ce possible? (1923)
 Un jour de folie (1923)
 On a trouvé une femme nue (with Jean Guitton, 1923), became 1934 movie
 La fleur d'oranger (with Georges Dolley, 1924), became 1944 movie Fiori d'arancio
 Un petit nez retroussé (with Nicolas Nancey, 1924)
 Le chemin des écoliers (1924)
 Mon vieux (with Henri Bataille, 1924)
 Le petit péché (1924)
 Chifforton (1925)
 Un déjeuner de soleil (1925), became 1927 musical Lovely Lady, 1927 movie Breakfast at Sunrise, 1937 French movie, 1939 Italian movie At Your Orders, Madame
 L'eunuque (with Henri Duvernois, 1927)
 La fille et le garçon (with Georges Dolley, 1927)
 Le chemin des écoliers (1927)
 Un déjeuner d'amoureux (1927)
 Votre sourire (1928), became 1934 movie
 Côte d'Azur (with Georges Dolley, 1931), became 1932 movie
 Baisers perdus (1932), translated by Phyllis Roberts as Lost Kisses, became 1945 movie Lost Kisses
 Ma sœur de luxe (1933)
 Tempête sur les côtes (1933)
 Dame Nature (1935), English adaptation by Patricia Collinge 1939, became 1953 movie 
 Fiston (1936), became 1937 movie My Son the Minister
 La Chaleur du sein (1937) aka Mother Love, became 1938 movie 
 Pamplemousse (1937), became Theresa Helburn's Little Dark Horse (1941)
 Le nid (1938)
 Plaire (1941)
 Le séducteur (1945)
 El ojo de Moscú (written in Spanish) (1952)
 Souviens-toi mon amour (1954)
 El dúo de Manón (written in Spanish) (1926)
 Calor de nido (1955 Spanish trans. of Le nid)
 Trois pas sur le boulevard (1971) three one-act plays: L'amour avec un A majuscule, Papoupa and Le paladin.

Memoirs
 Tous feux éteints (1971)

Filmography 
Breakfast at Sunrise, directed by Malcolm St. Clair (1927, based on the play Un déjeuner de soleil) 
The Girl and the Boy, directed by Wilhelm Thiele and Roger Le Bon (French, 1931, based on the play La fille et le garçon) 
**Two Hearts Beat as One, directed by Wilhelm Thiele (German, 1932, based on the play La fille et le garçon) 
Côte d'Azur, directed by Roger Capellani (France, 1932, based on the play Côte d'Azur) 
Orange Blossom, directed by Henry Roussel (France, 1932, based on the play La fleur d'oranger) 
Buridan's Donkey, directed by Alexandre Ryder (France, 1932, adaptation of a play by Gaston Arman de Caillavet and Robert de Flers) 
, directed by Léo Joannon (France, 1934, based on the play On a trouvé une femme nue) 
Votre sourire, directed by Monty Banks and Pierre Caron (France, 1934, based on the play Votre sourire) 
, directed by Christian-Jaque (France, 1935, based on the novel Voyage d'agrément) 
My Son the Minister, directed by Veit Harlan (Germany, 1937, based on the play Fiston) 
, directed by Jean Boyer (France, 1938, based on the play La Chaleur du sein) 
At Your Orders, Madame, directed by Mario Mattoli (Italy, 1939, based on the play Un déjeuner de soleil) 

À vos ordres, Madame, directed by Jean Boyer (France, 1942, based on the short story Chfr. 35) 
Lost Kisses, directed by Mario Soffici (Argentina, 1945, based on the play Baisers perdus) 
La Femme fatale, directed by Jean Boyer (France, 1946, based on the play La Femme fatale) 

References

External links
 
 https://www.imdb.com/name/nm0083215
 http://www.4-wall.com/authors/authors_b/birabeau_andre.htm

20th-century French dramatists and playwrights
20th-century French novelists
20th-century French male writers
1890 births
1974 deaths
French male novelists